Herina pseudoluctuosa is a species of picture-winged fly in the genus Herina of the family Ulidiidae found in Hungary, Italy, and Switzerland.

References

Ulidiidae
Insects described in 1939
Diptera of Europe